Jean Paul Lal, better known by his stage name Lal Jr., is an Indian film director and actor who mainly works in the Malayalam film industry. He is the son of actor-director Lal. His directorial debut movie was Honey Bee starring Asif Ali which was a hit. He also played his acting debut as main villain in the movie Under World.

Personal life

Jean Paul Lal was born to Lal and Nancy on 2 June 1988. He has a younger sister Monica Lal who completed her post-graduation from London. He studied filmmaking at New York Film Academy. Lal Jr married Blessy Susan Varghese on 26 December 2013 and they have a son.

Filmography

As actor

As director

References

External links
 

Malayalam film directors
1988 births
Living people
Film directors from Kochi
Male actors from Kochi
Indian male film actors
Male actors in Malayalam cinema
21st-century Indian film directors